The 1913–14 NC State Wolfpack men's basketball team represents North Carolina State University during the 1913–14 NCAA men's basketball season. The Head coach was John Hegarty coaching the team in his first season.

Schedule

References

NC State Wolfpack men's basketball seasons
NC State
NC State Wolf
NC State Wolf